Lucha Underground has held a number of professional wrestling tournaments involving wrestlers that are a part of their roster as part of their television series.

Tournaments

Trios Tournament

Lucha Underground Trios Championship Tournament (2015)
Lucha Underground held a tournament to determine which team of three wrestlers would become the first to hold Lucha Underground Trios Championship. The matches took place over four weeks, starting with Episode 21 ("Uno! Dos! Tres!) and culminating on episode 24 ("Trios Champions").

Tournament participants
Pentagon Jr., Sexy Star and Super Fly
Big Ryck, Killshot and Willie Mack
Angélico, Ivelisse and Son of Havoc 
Aero Star, Drago and Fenix
Hernandez, Johnny Mundo and Prince Puma
Cage, King Cuerno and Texano

Lucha Underground Trios Championship Tournament (2016)
Lucha Underground held a tournament to determine which team of three wrestlers would become the new Lucha Underground Trios Championship The matches took place over four weeks, starting with Episode 11 ("Bird of War") and culminating on episode 16 ("Graver Consequences"). The champions were allowed a bye to the finals beings the defending champions.
Tournament participants
Mariposa, Marty Martinez and Willie Mack
Cortez Castro, Joey Ryan and Mr. Cisco
Angélico, Ivelisse and Son of Havoc 
Cage, Johnny Mundo and Taya
Fenix, Jack Evans and P. J. Black
Dragon Azteca Jr., Prince Puma and Rey Mysterio
The Disciples of Death (Barrio Negro, El Sinestro de la Muerte and Trece).

Tournament 4 A Unique Opportunity (2016)

Battle of the Bulls Tournament 
Lucha Underground held a tournament to determine which wrestler would become the new Lucha Underground Championship number 1 contender and face the winner of the match between Sexy Star and Johnny Mundo, which resulted to be the latter. The matches took place in fatal four-way matches over three weeks, starting with Episode 14 ("Bulls of Boyle Heights") and culminating on episode 16 ("The Battle of the Bulls").

The Cueto Cup 
A 32-person tournament, part of Lucha Underground Season 3. The tournament was announced on episode 21, and began on episode 22.

Matches

Aztec Warfare

Aztec Warfare I
Lucha Underground held a 20-person intergender elimination match where a wrestler could be eliminated by pinfall or submission and has to take place inside a ring and not by throwing over the tope ropes and having both feet must landing the floor. There are no count outs and no disqualifications. The match took place on October 5, 2014 and was broadcast as Episode 9 of Lucha Underground on January 7, 2015. The 20 wrestlers entered the match at timed intervals, every 90 seconds. The previous week (Episode 8, "A Unique Opportunity") Mil Muertes defeated Fénix, giving Muertes the last entrant and Fénix would start the match. In the end Prince Puma pinned Johnny Mundo to become the first ever Lucha Underground Champion.

Aztec Warfare I entrances and eliminations

Aztec Warfare II
Lucha Underground held the second ever Aztec Warfare match during the second season, which featured 21 participants in total with the Lucha Underground Championship at stake. The match was recorded on December 12, 2015. The match was broadcast as Episode 9 of Lucha Underground's second season on March 23, 2016.

Aztec Warfare 2 entrances and eliminations

Aztec Warfare III
Lucha Underground held the third ever Aztec Warfare match during the third season, which featured 20 participants in total with the Lucha Underground Championship at stake. The match was recorded on April 9, 2016. The match was broadcast as Episode 11 of Lucha Underground's third season on November 16, 2016.

Aztec Warfare 3 entrances and eliminations

Aztec Warfare IV
Lucha Underground held the fourth ever Aztec Warfare match during the fourth season, which featured 20 participants in total with the Lucha Underground Championship at stake. The match was recorded on February 24, 2018. The match was broadcast as Episode 1 of Lucha Underground's fourth season on June 13, 2018.

Aztec Warfare 4 entrances and eliminations

Battle royales

Season 1
Episode 8 battle royale

Episode 37 battle royale

Other accomplishments

Golden Aztec Medallion

Season 1 holders

Season 2 holders

Episode 22 holders

Season 3 holders

Season 4 holders

See also
Professional wrestling tournament

References

Tournaments
Professional wrestling tournaments
Professional wrestling-related lists